Round About Midnight is an album by jazz trumpeter Miles Davis that was originally released by Columbia Records in March 1957. It was Davis' first album with Columbia.

Background
At the Newport Jazz Festival in 1955, Davis performed the song Round Midnight" as part of an all-star jam session, with the song's composer Thelonious Monk, along with Connie Kay and Percy Heath of the Modern Jazz Quartet, Zoot Sims, and Gerry Mulligan. Davis's solo received a positive reception from many jazz fans and critics. His response to this performance was typically laconic: "What are they talking about? I just played the way I always play." George Avakian of Columbia Records was in the audience, and his brother Aram persuaded him that he ought to sign Davis to the label.

Davis signed with Columbia and formed his "first great quintet" with John Coltrane on saxophone. Round About Midnight was his first album for the label. He was still under contract to Prestige, but he had an agreement that he could record material for Columbia to release after the expiration of his Prestige contract. Recording took place at Columbia studios; the first session was on October 26, 1955 at Studio D, during which the track "Ah-Leu-Cha" was recorded with three numbers that did not appear on the album. This is the first studio recording of the quintet. The remainder of the album was recorded during sessions on June 5, 1956 ("Dear Old Stockholm", "Bye Bye Blackbird" and "Tadd's Delight") and September 10, 1956 ("All of You" and the titular Round Midnight") at Columbia's 30th Street Studio. During the same period, the Miles Davis Quintet was also recording sessions to fulfill its contract with Prestige.

Reissues
On April 17, 2001, Sony reissued the album on compact disc for its Columbia/Legacy label with 24-bit audio remastering and four previously released bonus tracks from the initial sessions. "Budo" had been released as part of the 1957 anthology album on Columbia, Jazz Omnibus, and "Sweet Sue, Just You" had appeared on the 1956 album by Leonard Bernstein explaining jazz to the classical audience, What Is Jazz. A two-disc reissue of June 14, 2005, included the 2001 reissue with a second disc containing Davis' 1955 Newport Jazz Festival performance of Round Midnight", along with a recording of the quintet's set from the 1956 Pacific Jazz Festival. The Newport track had been released for the first time the previous year on the Legacy compilation Happy Birthday Newport: 50 Swinging Years!

Reception

In his five-star review in the May 16, 1957 issue of DownBeat magazine, Ralph J. Gleason called the album "modern jazz conceived and executed in the very best style." Ralph Berton of The Record Changer called the album "orthodox, middle-of-the-road conservative progressive jazz." The Penguin Guide to Jazz said it "sounds like a footnote" to the Prestige contractual obligation sessions (Miles, Relaxin', Workin', Steamin', and Cookin') and that "the material is fine but somehow fails to cast quite the consistent spell which the Prestige recordings do." Bob Rusch of Cadence wrote, "everything about this date, from the black-and-white cover photo, washed in red, of Miles Davis, removed in thought behind dark glasses, to the performances, is classic. Not surprisingly, careful packaging and exquisite artistry have created a legend and, in this case, one of the essential recordings in the history of recorded music."

Track listing

Side one

Side two

 Sides one and two were combined as tracks 1–6 on CD reissues.

2001 bonus tracks

2005 anniversary edition bonus disc
 All tracks were recorded live at the Pacific Jazz Festival, Pasadena Civic Auditorium, February 18, 1956, except where indicated.

Personnel
 Miles Davis – trumpet
 John Coltrane – tenor saxophone
 Red Garland – piano
 Paul Chambers – double bass
 Philly Joe Jones – drumset

Newport personnel bonus disc track one
 Miles Davis – trumpet
 Zoot Sims – tenor saxophone
 Gerry Mulligan – baritone saxophone
 Thelonious Monk – piano
 Percy Heath – double bass
 Connie Kay – drumset

Production personnel
 George Avakian – producer, liner notes
 Frank Laico – engineer
 Teo Macero – mastering
 Aram Avakian, Don Hunstein, Dennis Stock – photography
 Seth Rothstein – reissue project director
 Bob Belden, Michael Cuscuna – reissue producers
 Ray Moore – reissue engineer
 Mark Wilder – reissue engineering and mastering
 Randall Martin – reissue design
 Howard Fritzson – reissue art director
 Bob Blumenthal – reissue liner notes

Notes

References
 Nisenson, E. Round About Midnight – A Portrait Of Miles Davis. Da Capo Press, 2nd ed., 1996.

1957 albums
Miles Davis albums
Columbia Records albums
Albums produced by George Avakian
Albums recorded at CBS 30th Street Studio
Albums produced by Michael Cuscuna
Album covers by S. Neil Fujita
Instrumental albums